is a single-volume horror manga written and illustrated by Junji Ito. It is listed as the third volume in the Junji Ito Horror Comic Collection and was published in English by ComicsOne. The table of contents lists all the stories as originally appearing in the magazine Monthly Halloween by Asahi Sonorama. The volume was published in Japan on December 25, 1997. It was published in French by Tonkam on June 18, 2008. Two stories from this volume, The Long Hair in the Attic and Headless Sculptures, were featured in the 2023 anime series Junji Ito Maniac: Japanese Tales of the Macabre.

Synopsis

The Long Hair in the Attic
Chiemi and her boyfriend Hiratsuka break up, with Hiratsuka explaining that while she tried to look her best for him, the relationship still was not satisfying enough. When Chiemi returns home, depressed by her loss, she is greeted by her sister, Eri, who tells her that she thinks the attic is infested with mice. That night, Chiemi burns a photograph of Hiratsuka, then remembers when he suggested she grow out her hair for him. Reflecting on the breakup, Chiemi cries herself to sleep.

The next morning, Chiemi wakes up and finds a dead mouse tangled in her long hair. She resolves to cut it and move on. Eri goes to find a pair of scissors for her, but suddenly hears Chiemi screaming. Both Eri and her mother rush to Chiemi’s room, only to find Chiemi decapitated, her head missing. The police are called, but neither the missing head nor any leads can be found.

A week later, Hiratsuka is awoken by a phone call, but no noise comes from the other end of the line. He then hears the sound of grinding teeth. Believing that he is to blame for Chiemi's death, and reasoning that it could have been a suicide, he is afflicted with remorse, and then receives a second phone call, much like the first.

A few days later, Eri asks her father for a flashlight so she can check the attic for mice, but he insists that he goes to check himself, much to Eri's warnings about his heart condition. After some time passes, Eri notices that her father wasn't answering her calls, and climbs up into the attic to investigate. There, she finds her father slumped against the wall, dead from a heart attack induced by fright. When she looks up, she finds Chiemi's head, suspended from the rafters by its extremely long hair. Eri tries to take the head down, only for it to use its hair to open its eyes and begins gnashing its teeth, to which Eri realizes the hair had come alive and had killed Chiemi to prevent her from cutting it. The hair unhooks Chiemi’s head from the rafters and slithers away to Hiratsuka’s house, where it torments him by attempting to force itself through cracks in the walls.

Approval
Kyosuke and Misuzu are two young adults very much in love with each other, who want to get married. However, obstacles to the marriage lie in the forms of Misuzu's father, who flatly refuses Kyosuke's requests, and Misuzu's brother, Setsuo, who also disapproves of the idea. Frustrated by constantly being rejected, Kyosuke breaks off the relationship.

At work, Kyosuke begins to fall for one of his colleagues, a woman named Yuko, who is sympathetic to his plight. After going out to dinner, he runs into Setsuo, whose opinion has suddenly changed, learning from him that he wants Kyosuke to marry his sister. Annoyed, Kyosuke initially refuses, but Setsuo gives him a bottle of his father's favourite drink to offer as a gift, and convinces him to try anyway. Later that night, Misuzu takes Kyosuke home to her father. There, she reveals that even though it's been a month since they broke up, she still loves him, and asks if he had been seeing anyone else, which Kyosuke denies. Unbeknown to both of them, Setsuo is spying on the young couple. Despite this show of affection, Misuzu's father still disapproves of the relationship.

Some time later, Yuko and Kyosuke are spending dinner at his house, when Misuzu suddenly arrives, wanting to take Kyosuke home again, to which he follows her to a cab. There, Misuzu asks him if Yuko is his new girlfriend, and Kyosuke confirms it. The following morning, Yuko doesn't arrive at work, and has fallen deathly ill. Kyosuke goes to visit her at the hospital, but is too late, and Yuko dies suddenly. In the evening, Misuzu pays another visit, and the two mourn Yuko, crying for the entire night.

Thirteen years pass, and Misuzu's father is just as stubborn as ever. One day, Kyosuke decides to directly challenge him, explaining that he will continue pushing for his approval for the marriage no matter what. When he heads to return home with Misuzu in tow, he realises that he left his bag in the house, and goes to retrieve it, overhearing Misuzu's father and Setsuo talking. Misuzu's father tells Setsuo that he is angry Kyosuke "took her away" from him, and that he still refuses to give Kyosuke what he wants. Exasperated, Kyosuke continues to ask for approval, and eventually formulates a plan to kill Misuzu's father. Some time later, Kyosuke poisons Misuzu's father's drink and waits for him to become ill. Sickened by the poison, Misuzu's father is admitted to hospital, where, beset by his decline, he finally tells Kyosuke why he refuses to let him marry Misuzu.

Thirteen years previously, on the day Kyosuke and Misuzu broke up, Misuzu confided in her father that she still had feelings for Kyosuke, and that her love was real, but he still refused to let his daughter marry him. In response, Misuzu committed suicide. After noticing that both he and Setsuo could see Misuzu's spirit, her father began to use the situation as a way to reconcile with the grief and guilt from his loss, as the spirit of his daughter would remain close for as long as he continued to refuse the marriage. After he finishes explaining the reasons for his refusal, Misuzu's father abruptly dies, leaving Kyosuke alone.

Kyosuke turns around to find that Misuzu, who had been attending to her father, is now missing. After returning home, wallowing in sorrow and remorse, he finds that his house is now haunted by Misuzu's ghost, who visits him every night to tell him that the marriage has been approved.

Beehive
Takano, an amateur entomologist, and his friend, Yoriko, are out for a walk. As the two walk together, Yoriko remarks that Takano hadn't collected any beehives lately, and Takano replies that he hadn't had the time lately to engage in his hobby. While embracing Yoriko, Takano notices a wasp nearby and follows it to locate its hive, though he stops when he notices the insect heading into the woods. Yoriko asks him what's wrong, but Takano tries to change the subject, then Yoriko asks him if he's afraid of the ghost which supposedly inhabits the woods, to which Takano feigns not knowing about. Yoriko then mentions that a strange boy who lived in the neighbourhood has been missing for quite some time.

Takano has a flashback to an event in which a colony of wasps built their nest on the side of Yoriko's house. Their neighbour tells them about a boy who can remove hives and nests by hand, without getting stung, when Takano arrives, and asks if he can take the hive. After being given permission, he says that he will return in the evening, when the insects are less active, but before he can return to do so, the boy mentioned by the neighbour visits Yoriko. Although Yoriko tells the boy that Takano will handle the nest, he explains that he will take it instead, and that the neighbourhood was once a forest, so the wasps are making nests where they can. After the boy takes the nest, Takano arrives, and protests that the nest belongs to him. The boy refuses, saying that the wasps are his friends, and he wants to protect them. When Takano attempts to grab the boy by the shoulder, the wasps emerge from the nest and attack him, though Yoriko intervenes. After asking to be friends, Takano runs off.

Later, Yoriko meets Takano again, who is busy luring a bee with tuna. The two then follow the bee to a cave, where they hear a loud buzzing noise, and encounter the boy again, feeding colonies of bees and wasps with meat from a dead frog. Takano wonders how the insects can get along, and why so many hives are in the cave, but soon leaves. Back in the present, Yoriko looks over Takano's collected hives, but then begins talking about the boy again, and that she thinks he was murdered.

That night, Takano returns to the cave. On the day he found it, he had murdered the boy by strangling him, then buried his body in a shallow grave inside the cave. After taking a shovel to the ground, he discovers a hive, but is startled by two men walking through the woods, and hurriedly digs it up. When he returns home, he finds blood on his hands. The next day, Yoriko tells Takano that the body of the boy was found by hunters, and that it had been decapitated, and that the men saw someone run away with the head. Nervously, Takano sees Yoriko off, and goes to his room, where he finds the hive dripping with blood. He cracks it open to find the boy's head, and learns that he had failed to kill him the first time; injured by the murder attempt, the boy had commanded his insects to build a hive around his head, where they had been attending to him until the moment Takano decapitated him with the shovel.  Suddenly, hornets fill the room and begin to attack Takano, eventually paralysing and killing him with their venom. Once Takano is dead, they begin ripping flesh from his body and moulding it to the hive, intending to rebuild the boy's body and revive him.

Dying Young
Ayako is a slightly ugly student, who is friends with her classmate Chizuru. One day, Chizuru suddenly becomes extremely beautiful, becoming popular at school, only to drop dead of a sudden heart attack. Everyone wonders what could have caused this, including another of Ayako's friends, Hiroko, who asks Ayako after the funeral if she thinks she will become pretty as well. Ayako, disturbed by the death of Chizuru, doesn't take well to the question. Over the next few days, Hiroko begins to change in appearance as well, and joins a clique of attractive students, leaving Ayako behind. Hiroko makes an off-hand comment that Ayako should become pretty like her, but Ayako becomes concerned about Hiroko's condition.

Soon enough, several of the girls in Ayako's class are becoming beautiful, but appear to be suffering from anemia as well. Those whose appearance hasn't changed yet touch Hiroko, hoping to 'catch' her beauty as if it were contagious, and eventually it turns out that this appears to be the case. As the number of girls afflicted with whatever makes them beautiful begins to increase, Ayako - her appearance still the same - only becomes more concerned about Hiroko. While walking with her boyfriend, Hiroko encounters her sister, Kaori, who has also become beautiful. Kaori tells Hiroko that she doesn't feel well, and suddenly falls dead on the spot. Panic spreads throughout the school, as the students believe a disease that makes you beautiful before you die could be spreading. Hiroko becomes bitter and cynical, and one day tells Ayako of a rumor going around that if someone afflicted with the disease kills an ugly girl on the third Friday of the month, they might be saved. Ayako is scared by Hiroko's willingness to believe the rumor, but rationalizes that Hiroko wouldn't want to kill anyone.

As time goes by, more girls die, and no explanation is found. An alternate theory emerges that the spate of deaths may be the result of the impending 21st century, but the theory of it being an epidemic still persists. Ayako's friends stop coming to school, including Hiroko. One night, Ayako hears noises outside her house. She goes to investigate, only to find Hiroko and her friends following an ugly girl, intending to stab her to death. Ayako manages to distract Hiroko's group for long enough for the girl to escape, but the effort is in vain, and the student is murdered by another beautiful girl lying in wait. Angry at Ayako for stopping her, Hiroko turns to attack Ayako but dies before she can reach her, her head falling in Ayako's lap.

Headless Sculptures
Students Shimada and Rumi belong to the Art club at their school, learning under the guidance of Mr. Okabe, a sculptor who is soon to have his sculptures - a set of headless human statues - featured in an exhibition. Shimada and Rumi regularly stay after school to help Okabe work on his statues, but one afternoon Rumi heads home early, annoyed after Shimada makes an off-hand joke about her possibly being a model for one of Okabe's works.

The next day, Rumi goes to Shimada's house to walk to school with him, but he replies that he feels unwell. When Rumi arrives at school, she learns that Okabe has been murdered, having been decapitated around midnight, just like his statues. Rumi, who has become aware that Shimada could be considered a suspect in the murder case as he stayed into the night to work with Okabe, covers for him. At the end of the day, two students, Masami and Sanae, head to the art block to retrieve Sanae’s books. Cautiously, they enter the classroom, noticing that the floor is covered in mats to hide bloodstains. Before they can leave, the two girls hear a strange sound and hide under a table. Suddenly, a seemingly-reanimated Okabe appears, his face frozen in a terrifying expression and mouth agape and attacks them.

Shimada returns to school a few days later, clad in his winter uniform and a surgical mask, and denies having anything to do with Okabe's murder. Shimada takes Rumi for a walk, where he tells her that Okabe is still alive, and was merely hiding in the art block to avoid attracting attention. Her attention piqued, Rumi asks Shimada who Okabe's supposed body belongs to if it is not him, and Shimada offers to show her. The two walk to the art block, then to the classroom. All of Okabe's statues are missing bar one, though the empty stands of the missing statues remain. Rumi notes that the air smells of something rotting. Suddenly, Shimada locks the door to the classroom and removes his mask, revealing that he is bleeding profusely from the mouth.

Ignoring Rumi's concerns, Shimada removes the cover from the remaining statue, revealing it to have Okabe's head attached to it, and that he intends to replace the head with that of Rumi, removing Okabe’s head from the artwork. Shimada pursues Rumi, only to lose his head when Rumi slaps him, revealing that he is one of the other statues, which had suddenly come to life. Rumi fights off the statue with a chair, causing it to trip and shatter into pieces, only for the statue that formerly held Okabe's head to give chase with a meat cleaver, angered that Rumi had killed ‘her fiancé’ and demanding that she give it her head. As she escapes, additional statues suddenly appear and join the chase through the art block.

Rumi continues to attempt to escape, entering a room on the upper floor, but then encounters the headless bodies of Shimada, Masami and Sanae. A group of statues in the room fight over the heads of the two students, with the two statues that end up with the heads being able to see Rumi. Advancing on her, the statues remark on Rumi's beauty, and want her head to replace one of theirs. Rumi looks on in horror as the female statue that once held Okabe’s head forces its arm through the window on the door, and all the statues proceed to swarm Rumi and grab at her head.

Flesh-Colored Horror
Momoko Takigawa, a kindergarten teacher, is on her way home one night when an unseen person douses her in a substance that hardens like glue. Though she manages to make it home, she has to cut her hair and dispose of her outfit after the chemical ruins both. One of her students, Chikara Kawabe, is cruel and abusive to the other children, and appears to be ill; he has no hair, very pale skin and sunken eyes, his appearance alone able to make the people around him uneasy. In class, he tears up displays on the walls, but when Takigawa stops him, he insists that he was only 'peeling' the work off the wall, and threatens the class with doing the same to their faces.

On the way home, Takigawa meets Chikara's mother, who doesn't have much to explain for Chikara's behavior, talking about him as if he wasn't her child, and simply claiming he was lonely. Ms. Kawabe invites Takigawa home to discuss Chikara's behavior in more detail, where she reveals that she is actually Chikara's aunt, Maya. His mother spends much of her time at home, and appears pale and gaunt. The entire house is covered in torn wallpaper, a result of Chikara's obsession with peeling things. Takigawa feels uncertain about what she sees, but notes that Chikara's mother appears to love the boy very much.

The next day, Chikara attempts to rip the skin off the face of one of his classmates and is finally expelled, though for days afterwards, he appears at the windows of the school, glaring at the students, and eventually follows Takigawa to her apartment, where her father who was visiting at the time has an opportunity to examine his skin. A trained doctor, Takigawa's father notes that Chikara's skin is thinning and that his fingerprints are missing, and recommends that the boy be seen by a specialist. Takigawa takes a protesting Chikara home to his mother, who dismisses the severity of Chikara's condition, despite Takigawa's concerns.

After Takigawa leaves, Chikara's mother and Maya prepare a strange chemical mixture on the stove, which they then apply to Chikara's whole body. After the chemical sets, they rip it off, much to the child's cries of pain, but his appearance hasn't changed, leading his mother to exclaim 'we failed again'. Though Maya suggests they stop trying the treatment on Chikara, his mother refuses, and frantically rips at the wallpaper out of frustration, saying that she wants to 'show him his true beauty', and that she wants to see it too.

Takigawa's father returns home, though as she sees him off, she notices a woman doused in the same substance she was a few days earlier, and gives chase. When she catches up to the assailant, she finds that Maya was responsible for the incident, who despondently explains that the mixture was a 'beauty medicine' according to her sister, and that it was developed by her late husband, Chikara's father. Obsessed with her idea of beauty, Chikara's mother began applying it to herself, and eventually began using it on Chikara as well; as a subtle form of protest, Maya had changed the formula of the medicine to make it useless, though it still damaged the boy's skin, so she began disposing of the medicine by throwing it at strangers instead.

Meanwhile, a nearby man notices Chikara's mother, clad in a black cloak and wide-brimmed hat, her body hidden in shadow. When she asks him if she is beautiful, and opens the cloak, he is shocked and runs away screaming, leaving her laughing maniacally. Maya attempts to convince Takigawa to forget everything she had been told, but before Takigawa could react, Chikara's mother emerges with a rock and knocks her unconscious, then abducts her, taking Takigawa to her home. There, she elaborates on her late husband's endeavors. A modern-day alchemist, Chikara's father attempted to create a medicine that would act as an elixir of life after being applied to the skin, and tested it on himself. An hour later, he experienced a transformation, only to die of shock after seeing the result. Far from being shocked, Chikara's mother was entranced by the beauty in her husband's transformed body, and obsessed with the appearance of the transformation, she attempted to replicate the effect on herself and her son.

Takigawa awakens to find Chikara's mother about to test the medicine on her, holding a bottle of acid, a main ingredient in the medicine. After she accidentally spills the acid on her leg, in a panic she urges Maya to 'get it off'. Maya pulls a zipper on her sister's body, releasing her skin from her muscles and organs underneath. As Maya washes the acid off the skin suit, Chikara's mother explains that this was the result of the medicine her husband had created; a separator of the skin. Believing this to be the true vision of beauty, she keeps her skin in a tank of saline solution to prevent it from drying out and dying, which in turn protects her from expiring from dehydration without her skin.

Suddenly, Chikara's mother noticed the bottle of liquid she spilled on her skin wasn't acid at all, but just water. Enraged, she blames Maya to tell her where the bottle of acid is. As her sister exclaims that her son has the right to see his muscles in the same way as his mother, Maya insists that she cannot tell her where it is. Chikara appears, carrying the bottle, but rather than give it to his mother, he opens it, then kicks over the saline tank holding her skin suit, destroying it with the acid. Horrified and infuriated, she turns to Maya, and demands to use her skin now that her own is destroyed, ripping hers off her head and upper body in the process. In a bid to protect his aunt, Chikara attacks his mother, ripping her calf muscles apart and forcing her to fall to the ground, now doomed to die of dehydration.

Maya, terrified of the possibility of dying without a significant amount of her skin, turns to face Takigawa, and admits that she had used the medicine three years ago. Though at the time Maya believed that she wanted to use it, she had been deceived by her sister, having been manipulated into taking the medicine under the guise that it would make her look beautiful. Horrified by the scene, Takigawa faints.

Reception
The manga has an overall staff rating on manga-news.com of 13 out of 20.

References

External links

Horror anime and manga
Asahi Sonorama manga
ComicsOne titles
Supernatural anime and manga